Code of the Wilderness is a 1924 American silent Western film directed by David Smith and starring John Bowers, Alice Calhoun, and Alan Hale.

Cast 
 John Bowers as Rex Randerson
 Alice Calhoun  as Ruth Harkness
 Alan Hale as Willard Masten
 Charlotte Merriam as Hagar
 Otis Harlan as Uncle Jephon
 Kitty Bradbury as Aunt Marth
 Joe Rickson as Tom Chavis
 Clifford Davidson as Jim Picket

Preservation status 
A print is preserved in France at Archives Du Film Du CNC (Bois D'Arcy archive).

References

External links 
 

1924 films
1924 Western (genre) films
American black-and-white films
Films directed by David Smith (director)
Silent American Western (genre) films
Vitagraph Studios films
1920s English-language films
1920s American films